Abaca slippers are made from dried abacá plants and leaves, as well as sometimes from dried pineapple plant leaves. Abaca slippers may be found in the Davao and Mindanao regions of the Philippines and are sold at many markets in the Philippines.

References

Folk footwear
Philippine footwear